The 1832 Ohio gubernatorial election was held on October 9, 1832.

Incumbent Democratic Governor Duncan McArthur did not run for re-election, instead running for the U.S. House of Representatives.

Democratic nominee Robert Lucas defeated Anti-Masonic nominee Darius Lyman.

General election

Candidates
Robert Lucas, Democratic, State Senator, Democratic nominee for Governor in 1830
Darius Lyman, Anti-Masonic, State Senator

Withdrew
Duncan McArthur, National Republican, incumbent Governor. McArthur withdrew in favour of Lyman.

Results

References

1832
Ohio
Gubernatorial